Dante Alighieri Academy (Dante Alighieri, DAA, or Dante; Official name: Dante Alighieri Catholic Academy) also known as Dante Alighieri Academy Catholic Secondary School is a Catholic public high school in Toronto, Ontario, Canada. Administered by the Toronto Catholic District School Board, it serves the Glen Park neighbourhood in the North York district. It has 926 students from grades 9-12 as of 2018–19. It was founded in 1974 by the Sisters of St. John the Baptist, and is named after Dante Alighieri, a major Italian poet of the Middle Ages in the 13th century.

History
The school was founded in September 1974 in cooperation with the Sisters of St. John the Baptist, St Charles Borromeo Roman Catholic Church and the Metropolitan Separate School Board (now known as the Toronto Catholic District School Board) to serve the predominantly Italian-Canadian community in the Dufferin-Lawrence neighbourhood with 180 students and nine teachers inside two portables and one portapak. The permanent three-storey building was erected in 1976 and the first addition was built in 1979. In 2005, the school constructed a 10,000 sq. ft. auditorium designed by Global Architects Inc.

Today the school serves over 1000 students serving the Lawrence Heights neighbourhood. Unlike primary and junior high schools, the TCDSB does not condition admission to its secondary schools on meeting its "Catholicity requirements"; the school's population is diverse and student body consists of Italians, Portuguese, Filipinos, White, Hispanic, Eastern Asians, and many others.

Due to overpopulation of the school, with the school building being medium-sized and students teaching classes in 20 portables, the school's grade 9 students were relocated to the former Bathurst Heights Secondary School in 2006 until 2011 when the school moved to the old Sir Sanford Fleming Academy as the students of that school was renamed to John Polanyi Collegiate Institute in the old Bathurst building. The campus became known as Beatrice Campus, named after Beatrice Portinari.

In 2011, the Toronto Catholic District Board received provincial funding to reconstruct Dante Alighieri Academy's outdated facilities. This culminated when Villa Charities, the owner of the Columbus Centre and the TCDSB announced a joint venture in December 2012 to build a new joint-use 400,000 sq. ft. school building expected to open in 2019. The announcement has met with controversy and opposition within the community protesting against the proposed demolition of the 1980s apartment building being redeveloped. As a result, the province rejected the proposed plan and the TCDSB severed ties with Villa Charities.

However, the replacement Dante school is expected to be built on the nearby Regina Mundi property with the existing Dante building converted into an elementary school. The school is now temporarily relocated to the former Don Bosco Catholic Secondary School in Etobicoke starting in the 2021-22 school year.

Academics and programs
Dante Alighieri is home to the board's Deaf And Hard Of Hearing program consisting of 30 students. The school also offers various programs such as arts, technological studies, English, Mathematics, science and guidance.

Notable alumni
Malin Akerman actress
DerHova - music producer, founder of the group Temperance
Richie Laryea Toronto FC player
Melissa Pagnotta Olympian (taekwondo)

See also 

List of high schools in Ontario

References

External links 
 Dante Alighieri Academy
 TCDSB Portal

Toronto Catholic District School Board
Educational institutions established in 1974
High schools in Toronto
North York
Catholic secondary schools in Ontario
Dante Alighieri
1974 establishments in Ontario